Minister of Defense of the Republic of North Macedonia is a post (minister) to lead the Ministry of Defense of North Macedonia. Currently, the post is held by Slavjanka Petrovska, since 2022. She succeeded Radmila Šekerinska who held the office from 2017 to 2022.

History
The first Macedonian defense minister was Trajan Gocevski, who was in office in 1992. Vlado Popovski and Vlado Buchkovski were re-elected for the post that means they have served for two mandates each. The minister for the shortest amount of time was the first one, Trajan Gocevski, while for the longest period was Vlado Popovski.

A list of all Ministers of Defense of North Macedonia follows:

References

Military of North Macedonia
North Macedonia